Clopton is both a surname and a given name. Notable people with the name include:

David Clopton (1820–1892), Alabama politician
Hugh Clopton (c. 1440 – 1496), Lord Mayor of the City of London
John Clopton (1756–1816), a United States Representative
Walter Clopton (died 1400), English lawyer and Chief Justice of the King's Bench
Clopton Havers (1657–1702) pioneering English physician
Clopton Lloyd-Jones (1858–1918), English businessman, footballer and cricketer

English-language surnames